Kulasekharamangalam  is a village in Kottayam district in the state of Kerala, India.

Demographics
 India census, Kulasekharamangalam had a population of 21296 with 10360 males and 10936 females.

References

Villages in Kottayam district